The Cape Town Holocaust & Genocide Centre began as  Africa's first Holocaust centre founded in 1999. The Centre works towards creating a more caring and just society in which human rights and diversity are respected and valued. Through exhibitions, events and workshops, they endeavour to commemorate the victims and survivors of the Nazi regime and the numerous genocides that happened before and since the Holocaust.

The museum has a permanent exhibition that combines text, archival photographs, film footage, documents, multimedia displays and recreated environments. They also offer educational programmes of various types, for groups such as students or educators. The Holocaust is taught within a South African context; lessons on racism and the apartheid are mixed together.

History

Tourist Information
The Centre is open from 10 am to 4 pm from Sunday-Thursday and 10-2 on Friday. Admission is free. Visitors can contact the centre at 021-462 5553 or admin@holocaust.co.za.

Exhibition
The permanent exhibition is made up of three different galleries. The first is dedicated to Racism and Discrimination, the second to the Third Reich and the third to Ghettos. Racism and Discrimination (Gallery 1) includes the following sections:
Racism
Antisemitism in South Africa
Apartheid
 Collection on The Final Solution
 Collection on Rescue, Resistance and liberation

The Third Reich (Gallery 2) includes
Jewish life in Europe before the Holocaust
Germany and the rise of Nazism 1919-1933
The Third Reich 1933-1939
The power of propaganda (masses)
The power of propaganda (youth)
Antisemitic policies
They too were victims
The Nazi concentration camp universe
Nazi camps
Seeking refuge
Kristallnacht-The night of broken glass
Nazism engulfs the Jews of Europe
 Collection on Deportation and the Death Camps
 Collection on Seeking Justice

Ghettos (Gallery 3) includes
Segregation and isolation
The Warsaw Ghetto
Mass murder begins

Highlights Include:
Collection on Anne Frank
20 minute video of Local survivors' Testimony

Patrons 
 Justice Richard J Goldstone
 Professor Pumla Gobodo-Madikizela
 Chief Rabbi Warren Goldstein
 Professor Jonathan Jansen
 Desmond M Tutu, Archbishop Emeritus

Trustees
 (Chairman)Gerald Diamond
 Philip Krawitz
 Natalie Barnett
 Ann Harris
 Myra Osrin
 Ernest Kajabo
 Beverley Cohen
 Prof Milton Shain
 Prof Tim Murithi

See also
List of Holocaust museums 
Simon Wiesenthal Center
Yad Vashem
Yom HaShoah

References

External links
Cape Town Holocaust Centre Website
South Africa: Holocaust Centre

Jews and Judaism in Cape Town
Museums in Cape Town
Holocaust museums
1999 establishments in South Africa
Museums established in 1999